Carl Arvid Einar "Knatten" Lundell (9 January 1894 – 29 March 1976) was a Swedish ice hockey and bandy player. He competed in the 1920 Summer Olympics. In 1920 he was a member of the Swedish ice hockey team which finished fourth in the Summer Olympics tournament. He played five matches.

References

External links
profile

1894 births
1976 deaths
Djurgårdens IF Hockey players
Ice hockey players at the 1920 Summer Olympics
IK Göta Bandy players
IK Göta Ishockey players
Olympic ice hockey players of Sweden
Swedish bandy players
Swedish ice hockey players